George Bitar Ghanem (born 13 May 1967) is a Lebanese lawyer and diplomat currently serving as Lebanon ambassador to Malaysia.

Early and education 
Ghanem was born in Deir El Qamar, Lebanon. He was educated at St. Joseph University where he received a bachelor’s degree in Law in 1989 and obtained a master’s degree in Public Law from La Sagesse University in 2011.

Career 
Ghanem began his career as an associate lawyer and solicitor at George Jabre law firm in Beirut from 1991 to 1996. After quitting this job, he joined the foreign ministry and rose through the ranks to the position of Consul General and was deployed in Sydney where he served from June 2012 to January 2018. He was appointed Lebanon ambassador to Malaysia on 29 January 2018.

References 

Lebanese diplomats
Lebanese lawyers
Saint Joseph University alumni
1967 births
Living people